Craig  A. "Clap" Clapperton (born 1967) is a United States Navy vice admiral and naval flight officer who serves as the commander of U.S. Fleet Cyber Command and the United States Tenth Fleet since August 4, 2022. He most recently served as the commander of Combined Joint Task Force, Cyber from June 30, 2021, to June 7, 2022. He previously served as commander of Carrier Strike Group 12 from May 7, 2020 to June 17, 2021. 

He also commanded the Shadowhawks of VAQ-141, relinquishing command in September 2007 to Commander Michael D. McKenna.

A native of Pittsburgh, Pennsylvania, Clapperton graduated from Pennsylvania State University with a Bachelor of Science in Aerospace Engineering, commissioning via the NROTC program in 1989 and designated a naval flight officer in 1991. In 2008, he earned an M.A. degree in National Strategy and Security Studies from the United States Naval War College (with highest distinction) and was a member of the college's elite Stockdale group. He is also a distinguished graduate of the Navy Nuclear Power Training Command and completed nuclear power training in 2010. He was the 2007 recipient of the Admiral James Bond Stockdale Award for Inspirational Leadership.

References

Living people
United States Naval Academy alumni
Naval War College alumni
People from Pittsburgh
Military personnel from Pennsylvania
Pennsylvania State University alumni
Recipients of the Defense Superior Service Medal
Recipients of the Legion of Merit
Recipients of the Air Medal
United States Navy admirals
1967 births